Pristurus adrarensis is a species of lizard in the Sphaerodactylidae family found in Mauritania.

References

Pristurus
Reptiles described in 2006